Flor y canela is a Mexican telenovela produced by Eugenio Cobo for Televisa in 1988. It is an original story of Spanish writer Benito Pérez Galdós, adapted by María Teresa Calderón and Marissa Garrido and directed by Luis Vélez.

Mariana Garza as Marianela, who later would be replaced by Daniela Leites, and Ernesto Laguardia starred as protagonists, while Mónica Miguel starred as the antagonist.

Plot
In the 1940s, in a Mexican mining town lives María de la Canela, nicknamed Marianela. This dirty and ragged orphan is despised by villagers who see it inherited traits madness of his mother committed suicide by jumping off a ravine. Is that where Marianela goes in search of advice ghost of his mother. The only loving being with the beggar is Pablo, a rich guy but blind Marianela who served as guide.

Unable to see Pablo a picture of your guide as a beautiful woman is created and does not let anyone tell you otherwise. Pablo's father arranged the marriage of his son with Florentina, the daughter of the village notary. Tomás, an ophthalmologist known advises that Pablo go to the United States operated. It was decided that the wedding will take place after Paul can already see.

When Pablo returns, cured, he is horrified to see the true aspect of Marianela, and prefers to Florentina corresponding to their ideal of feminine beauty. However, Florentina in love with Carlos, a mining engineer married a frivolous woman. The Marianela desperate attempts suicide, but is rescued by Tomás who falls for her.

Cast 
 Mariana Garza as María de la Canela "Marianela" #1
 Daniela Leites as María de la Canela "Marianela" #2
 Ernesto Laguardia as Pablo
 Edith González as Florentina
 Ari Telch as Tomás García
 Edgardo Gazcón as Carlos
 Salvador Sánchez as Sinforoso
 Guillermo Murray as Francisco
 Oscar Morelli as Manuel
 Aurora Molina as Dorotea
 Ricardo De Loera as Remigio
 Mónica Miguel as Ana
 Rosita Pelayo as Juana
 Miguel Córcega as El Galán
 Adalberto Parra as Atanasio
 Rosario Zúñiga as Josefa
 Christian Ramírez as Felipín
 Marta Resnikoff as Florence
 Irlanda Mora as Trudi
 Isabel Andrade as Paca
 Aurora Cortés
 Germán Bernal
 Cecilia Gabriela
 José Elías Moreno

Awards

References

External links
 

1988 telenovelas
Mexican telenovelas
1988 Mexican television series debuts
1988 Mexican television series endings
Spanish-language telenovelas
Television shows set in Mexico
Televisa telenovelas